"Lookin' Through the Windows" is a song written by Clifton Davis released by The Jackson 5 in 1972. It is the title track and second single from the album Lookin' Through the Windows. Produced by Hal Davis, it peaked at No. 16 on the Billboard Hot 100. The Japanese release is labelled with the text "ジャクソン・ファイヴ,窓辺のデイト, ラブ・ソング"

Charts

References

External links

The Jackson 5 songs
1972 songs
1972 singles
Song recordings produced by Hal Davis
Songs written by Clifton Davis
Motown singles